The Independent Gay Forum was an organization that sponsored a website featuring free access to articles and opinions penned by gay economical conservative, center-right Independent and libertarian gay authors. Its raison d'etre was dissatisfaction by some lesbians and gay men with the alleged center-left or liberal orthodoxy of the lesbian and gay rights movement in the United States. It was founded around 1998 and dissolved in 2010, believing its mission had been largely accomplished. Its blog, by Stephen H. Miller, continues at the website IGFCultureWatch, which also hosts the Forum's article archives.

Rise of the new 'gay right' movement

In 1993, Bruce Bawer published his book A Place at the Table that criticized homophobic social conservatives and U.S. Democratic Party-aligned and center-left lesbians and gay men in the United States. He argued that this political bias produced an unworkable and partisan bias which locked lesbian and gay voters into endorsement of one partisan choice, instead of bipartisan political initiatives that focused on both the Democrat and Republican Parties, as well as questioning the relevance and importance of some broad center-left goals and objectives to lesbian and gay communities in the United States.

Bawer called for full inclusion of gays in mainstream society and criticized what he considered an unrepresentative but highly visible gay subculture that equated homosexuality with promiscuity, hedonism, political correctness or stereotypes like being effeminate or "different" in general.

In 1995, Andrew Sullivan published the book Virtually Normal.  Sullivan was a longtime critic of decadence in the gay community, but the book also did something that Bawer did not do.  Sullivan criticized what he called the prohibitionist, liberationist, liberal, and conservative approaches to gay rights in favor of a more "classical liberal" or libertarian approach.  

In 1996, Bawer edited a collection of writings by mostly gay men and women titled Beyond Queer: Challenging Gay Left Orthodoxy.  The authors--including Sullivan, Jonathan Rauch, Stephen H. Miller, Paul Varnell, and Norah Vincent--covered a wide range of topics and did not have one political message.  Some authors were critical of how the gay rights movement was trying to achieve its goals, some were critical of certain goals such as hate crime laws, and others were critical of both the ends and the means.  

These books became labeled in leftist gay circles as the manifesto of a new "Gay Right" though many of the authors in these books would dispute being labeled conservative.  Some had libertarian political sympathies. 

The Independent Gay Forum became a significant online site for U.S. lesbian and gay authors that endorsed limited-government conservative or libertarian alternatives to what they saw as the 'impractical' center-left bias that 'characterizes' lesbian and gay identity and politics.  Additional writers include philosopher John Corvino, activist Richard Rosendall and columnist Jennifer Vanasco.

The website included hundreds of articles on a wide range of political and cultural topics -- marriage, sex, religion, economics, law, politics, activism, books, and gay identity. It also included "IGF Culture Watch", a blog authored by Miller.

Criticism of the IGF

Liberal criticism
Critics of the Independent Gay Forum's writings tend to be drawn between a division between liberals and conservatives and a second division between conservatives and libertarians. The Independent Gay Forum mission statement is to forge a new "gay mainstream" that is committed to more conservative-libertarian values; i.e., limited government, free market capitalism and personal responsibility.

Liberal critics felt that the Independent Gay Forum was too closely aligned with the Republican Party, to be called "Independent", and that its writers demonstrated too little respect for cultural diversity, social justice and social responsibility.  IGF writers would often endorse conservative Republican theories about the harm that gun control legislation would pose to lesbian and gay handgun owners, arguing that such controls infringe constitutional rights under the Second Amendment, welfare 'reform', Social Security privatization, abortion, and the neo-conservative theory about initiating military action in order to promote a freedom and democracy in certain nations such as Iran and Iraq.

In another was when Miller supported Republican Arnold Schwarzenegger's successful bid to become governor of California, praising his socially liberal, fiscally conservative philosophy.  Liberal critics pointed out that Miller was much less supportive of Vermont Governor Howard Dean's bid for governor who ran on a similar neoliberal philosophy.  

In another case, gay liberals also argued that the articles about the late, former U.S. President Ronald Reagan were too partisan and tried to rewrite the Reagan Administration's policies on AIDS and gay rights.

Libertarian criticism

Libertarians criticism of the IGF tends to be tied to a belief that the writers do not go far enough in advocating for reducing government regulations that limit citizens personal and economic life.  Yet, a second source of criticism, among libertarians is that the IGF writers do not advocate election law reforms that would allow the Libertarian Party to freely compete for votes in elections. 

When Miller defended the work of gay Republicans by using an analogy of the benefits to the consumer that occur when there is more than one grocery store in a town.  The message was that gay voters, like consumers, would get a better deal with more competition for their support.  This angered many Libertarians as the 'grocery store analogy' ignored the fact that government regulations as ballot access law make it hard for a third political party such as the Libertarian Party to compete for the support of gay citizens because they have to spend limited resources in order to obtain access on the general election ballot with a party affiliation.  Thus some libertarians felt that Miller should have been a better advocate for greater voter choice.

Topics

Aside from Miller, other writers have contributed to the Independent Gay Forum and have written numerous articles about current events such as gay marriage, civil unions, the Marriage Protection Amendment, transgender rights, the Employment Non-Discrimination Act, hate crime or hate speech bans, 
the religious right, the military gay ban, Social Security, the War in Iraq, and the Second Amendment.

References

 Independent Gay Forum webpage

LGBT-related websites
LGBT conservatism